Claudia Whitfort (born 31 July 1999) is an Australian rules footballer playing for the Gold Coast in the AFL Women's competition (AFLW). She has previously played for Melbourne and St Kilda.

Early life
Whitford was born in Melbourne and raised in Mount Eliza, Victoria on the Mornington Peninsula. She was an athlete and at Box Hill Athletics Club. She played netball for the Peninsula Waves Netball Club in the Victorian Netball League and represented Victoria three years in a row. 

She also played football with the Casey Demons (VFLW) and off-season with St Mary's Football Club (NTFL) but her main focus was netball until she began playing for the Southern Saints (St Kilda VWFL) forging a reputation as a hard-hitting pressure tackler and hard ball winner.

Whitfort was drafted by Melbourne with the club's fourth selection and the 30th pick overall in the 2017 AFL Women's draft.

AFLW career
She made her debut in the six point win against Brisbane at Casey Fields in round 5 of the 2018 season.

In April 2019, Whitfort was traded to expansion club St Kilda.

In June 2021, Whitfort was traded to the Gold Coast in exchange for pick #36.

References

External links 

1999 births
Living people
Melbourne Football Club (AFLW) players
Australian rules footballers from Melbourne
St Kilda Football Club (AFLW) players
Gold Coast Football Club (AFLW) players
People from Mount Eliza, Victoria
Sportswomen from Victoria (Australia)